Rajguru Gajraj Mishra also spelled Gajaraj Mishra was a Nepalese politician, ambassador, diplomat and a royal priest of Shah dynasty. He was always inclined to his disciple Prince Regent Bahadur Shah of Nepal. Gajraj Mishra was disfavoured by his disciple King Pratap Singh Shah due to his support to Prince Bahadur Shah. He was also disfavoured by Pratap Singh's son Rana Bahadur Shah.

Life

Favourism to Bahadur Shah
King Prithvi Narayan Shah had appointed Pandit Gajraj Mishra as an attendant and permanent resident in Banaras to watch over the activities of the neighbouring countries. On January 1775, King Prithvi Narayan Shah died at Nuwakot. In order to prevent Prince Bahadur Shah from being a Chautariya(royal chief minister), Swarup Singh Karki marched with army to Nuwakot to confine Prince Bahadur who was then mourning the death of his father former King Prithvi Narayan Shah. Bahadur Shah was confined on the orders of newly crowned King Pratap Singh Shah. Guru Gajraj Mishra was a teacher of both King Pratap Singh and Prince Bahadur. On his visit to offer blessings to his disciple and newly crowned King Pratap Singh, he was disappointed with the confinement of his other disciple Prince Bahadur Shah. He requested to the King that instead of confinement, Prince Bahadur should be given a fresh life at exile.

On 1778 AD, Queen Rajendra Laxmi succeeded in the confinement of Prince Bahadur Shah with the help of her new minister Sarbajit Rana Magar. Guru Gajraj Mishra again came to rescue Bahadur Shah on the condition that Bahadur Shah should leave the country.

Treaty of Commerce and Alliance
During the tenure of Mulkaji Bakhtawar Singh Basnyat, on 28 October 1801, a Treaty of Commerce and Alliance was finally signed between Nepal and East India Company. The treaty was signed by Gajraj Mishra, on the behalf of Nepal Durbar, and Charles Crawford, on the behalf of East India Company, in Danapur, India.

King Rana Bahadur wrote letters to his brothers Chautariya Sher Bahadur Shah and Chautariya Bidur Shahi from Banaras during his exile where he blatantly blamed that Gajraj Mishra and Damodar Pande planned to dethrone Girvan Yuddha Bikram Shah and make Chautariya Krishna Shah as the King of Nepal after the signing of the Treaty of Commerce and Alliance with British.
He also manipulated Mulkaji (Prime Minister) Bakhtawar Singh Basnyat and members of the Council of Kajis against Guru Gajraj Mishra and ordered not to follow any of the Mishra's commandments.

Sugauli Treaty
The Treaty of Sugauli was signed by between British India and Kingdom of Nepal. The representatives for Nepal were Chandra Shekhar Upadhyaya and Pandit Gajraj Mishra.

References

Footnotes

Notes

Books

 

 
 

Nepalese politicians
People of the Nepalese unification